African dodger, also known as Hit the Coon or Hit the Nigger Baby, was a carnival game played in the United States of America (USA). In the game, an African-American man would stick his head through a curtain, and attempt to dodge objects, such as eggs or baseballs, thrown at him by players. Despite the obvious brutality of hitting someone in the head with eggs or baseballs, it was a popular carnival game from the 1880s up to the 1960s. The victims often suffered serious injuries. 

A Popular Mechanics article from 1910 noted that African Dodger had become "too old and commonplace" and was being replaced with dunk tanks in which African-Americans would fall into a tank of water when a target was hit with a ball. The illustration accompanying the article shows a game labeled "Drop the Chocolate Drop" and is captioned "Amusing to All but the Victim". Smaller kit-based versions of the game were also sold to be played at home.

In popular culture
African dodger has been depicted in comic strips and cartoons, including Donald Duck and Popeye.

Kurt Vonnegut describes the game in his 1973 novel Breakfast of Champions.

Norman Maclean remembers the game in his 1976 novel A River Runs Through It.

See also
Shoot the Freak

References

African-American cultural history
African-American history between emancipation and the civil rights movement
Amusement parks in the United States
Obsolete blood sports
Carnival games
Fairs in the United States
Racially motivated violence against African Americans
Sideshow attractions
Sports targets
Anti-black racism in the United States